Anton Christian Corbin (born March 21, 1974) is an American teacher and former professional football quarterback who played one season with the BC Lions of the Canadian Football League. He was drafted by the San Diego Chargers in the seventh round of the 1997 NFL Draft. Corbin played college football at California State University, Sacramento and attended Turlock High School in Turlock, California. He was also a member of the Frankfurt Galaxy, Portland Forest Dragons, New York CityHawks and the Winnipeg Blue Bombers. He currently works at Mission Bay High School teaching computer animation and game design.

Professional career

San Diego Chargers
Corbin was drafted by the San Diego Chargers with the 237th pick in the 1997 NFL Draft. He was released in August 1997.

Frankfurt Galaxy
Corbin was drafted by the Frankfurt Galaxy with the 101st pick in the 1998 NFL Europe League draft. He was released in March 1998.

Portland Forest Dragons
Corbin signed with the Portland Forest dragons in April 1998.

New York CityHawks
Corbin was traded from the Portland Forest Dragons to the New York CityHawks where he played during the 1998 season.

BC Lions
Corbin was signed by the BC Lions on April 5, 2001. He started 2 games during the 2001 season and was released in January 2002.

Winnipeg Blue Bombers
Corbin signed with the Winnipeg Blue Bombers in May 2002 but was released before the start of the season.

References

External links
Just Sports Stats
2013 Sacramento State Football Media Guide

Living people
1974 births
Players of American football from California
American football quarterbacks
Canadian football quarterbacks
American players of Canadian football
Sacramento State Hornets football players
New York CityHawks players
BC Lions players
People from Turlock, California